Local elections were held in Fiji on 5 November 1972, with voters electing members of the councils of Lautoka and Suva. They were the first local elections after the common electoral roll was introduced.

Results

Suva
In Suva, the Alliance Party won fourteen seats on the City Council and the National Federation Party six, with the Alliance Party's Peter Allan elected mayor.

Lautoka
In Lautoka, the National Federation Party won eight seats and the Alliance Party four, with the NFP's Hari Punja elected mayor.

References

Local
Municipal elections in Fiji
Fiji